The Lifan 530 is a four-door subcompact sedan produced by the Chinese manufacturer Lifan.

Overview

The Lifan 530 subcompact car debuted as a concept called the Lifan 520 at the 2011 Guangzhou Auto Show in November 2011. Later the Lifan 530 subcompact car was launched on the 2013 Shanghai Auto Show and was available to the China car market in October 2013.

The design of the Lifan 530 subcompact car was clearly inspired by the Toyota Vios XP90, as the dimensions are similar and the side profile is exactly the same.

Engine and transmission 
The lone engine during debut was Lifan's 1.5 liter petrol engine producing 102hp and 110nm of torque, and the gear box is a 5-speed manual gear box. The 1.5 liter petrol engine producing 102hp was added at market launch in 2013 as well as a CVT. Price range of the Lifan 530 at launch starts at 51,800 yuan and ends at 69,800 yuan.

References

External links 

 Lifan global site

Cars introduced in 2013
Cars of China
Front-wheel-drive vehicles
530
Sedans
Subcompact cars